Andrei Meshcheryakov may refer to:
Andrei Meshcheryakov (footballer) (born 1984), Russian football player
Andrei Meshcheryakov (swimmer) (born 1994), Russian swimmer
Andrei Meshcheryakov (serial killer) (born 1978), Russian robber and serial killer